Shkodran Metaj (born 5 February 1988) is a Kosovar footballer who plays for HHC Hardenberg in the Dutch Tweede Divisie.

Club career
Metaj was born in Studenica, Pejë, SFR Yugoslavia. He started to play football with amateur club VV Froombosch, before being scouted by Dutch top flight club FC Groningen, who then signed him and entered him into their youth system.

Just before the 2007–08 Eredivisie season started, he was asked to join FC Groningen's senior squad. On September 2, 2007, Metaj made his professional debut in an away game against AFC Ajax, and later signed a contract due to expire in 2012.

Metaj spent the 2009–10 season on loan to newly promoted Eredivisie side RKC Waalwijk, with the aim for the youngster to make more first team experience. In the next season he again played few matches for Groningen, so he left on loan to FC Emmen. In the summer of 2012 he finally left Groningen and signed permanently with Emmen.

Flamurtari
Metaj signed a two-year contract with Albanian Superliga side Flamurtari Vlorë as a free agent on 29 July 2014.

International career
Metaj also represented occasionally the Netherlands as several youth levels, including Netherlands U16, Netherlands U17 and Netherlands U21.

References

1988 births
Living people
Sportspeople from Peja
Kosovan emigrants to the Netherlands
Association football midfielders
Kosovan footballers
Kosovo international footballers
Dutch footballers
Netherlands youth international footballers
FC Groningen players
RKC Waalwijk players
FC Emmen players
HHC Hardenberg players
Eredivisie players
Eerste Divisie players
Tweede Divisie players
Kosovan expatriate footballers
Expatriate footballers in Albania
Kosovan expatriate sportspeople in Albania